Goskonyushnya is a rural locality (a settlement) in Kamennobrodskoye Rural Settlement, Olkhovsky District, Volgograd Oblast, Russia. The population was 12 as of 2010.

Geography 
Goskonyushnya is located in the valley of the Ilovlya River, 16 km southwest of Olkhovka (the district's administrative centre) by road. Mikhaylovka is the nearest rural locality.

References 

Rural localities in Olkhovsky District